Gordon was an electoral district of the House of Assembly in the Australian state of South Australia from 1993 to 2002. The district was based on and around the town of Mount Gambier.

First created for the 1993 state election, it was essentially a new name for the seat of Mount Gambier. At the 2002 state election, the name Gordon was dropped and the old name of Mount Gambier was restored.

Members for Gordon

Election results 

Former electoral districts of South Australia
1993 establishments in Australia
2008 disestablishments in Australia